Midway Heights is an unincorporated community in Montgomery County, Virginia. It lies at an elevation of 2080 feet (634 m).

References

Unincorporated communities in Montgomery County, Virginia
Unincorporated communities in Virginia